József Horváth (born 9 June 1947) is a Hungarian equestrian. He competed in two events at the 1972 Summer Olympics.

References

External links
 

1947 births
Living people
Hungarian male equestrians
Olympic equestrians of Hungary
Equestrians at the 1972 Summer Olympics
Sportspeople from Komárom-Esztergom County